Have I Told You Lately That I Love You? is a compilation album by Jim Reeves, released in 1964 on RCA Camden.

Most tracks on this compilation are taken from Reeves' 1956 album "Singing Down the Lane".

Track listing 
 US version

 UK version

Charts

References 

1964 compilation albums
Jim Reeves albums
RCA Camden compilation albums